Kavi Sukanta Metro Station is a station of Line 6 of the Kolkata Metro in Kalikapur, a southern neighbourhood of Kolkata, India, serving the areas of Kalikapur, Haltu and Nandi Bagan. The station is named in honour of the revolutionary Bengali poet Sukanta Bhattacharya.

See also
List of Kolkata Metro stations

Kolkata Metro stations
Railway stations in Kolkata